Dialogues of Exiles is a 1975 French-Chilean satirical film with documentary elements directed by Raúl Ruiz.

Plot
Chilean exiles in Paris are shown discussing the challenges they faced following the 1973 Chilean coup d'état. In an attempt to reeducate a touring singer from their homeland, they kidnap him. This marks Ruiz's debut French film, in which he examines the mannerisms and language used by his fellow exiles. Having been a member of this community, he depicts a shared sense of belonging among those living in exile, brought together by the tragic downfall of the Allende government and the brutality of the Pinochet dictatorship.

Cast
 Françoise Arnoul
 Carla Cristi
 Daniel Gélin
 Sergio Hernández
 Percy Matas
 Etienne Bolo
 Edgardo Cozarinsky
 Huguette Faget
 Luis Poirot
 Waldo Rojas
 Valeria Sarmiento

Reception
Dialogues of Exiles ultimately led to Ruiz's ostracism from the Chilean exile community due to its critical and, at times, unfriendly portrayal of them. Ruiz's depiction of the exiles is laced with scathing humor, and many complained that he had trivialized serious issues such as adaptation, language, space, integration, and cultural shock. Despite the backlash, he continued to explore themes of Chilean identity, dictatorship, and exile in his films.

Bibliography
 
 Blaine, Patrick. "Reconstructing Resistant Memory in the Chilean Social Documentary: Guzmán and Ruiz." Morningside College. Congress of the Latin American Studies Association, Toronto, Canada. 2010

References

External links

https://web.archive.org/web/20170303202239/http://basessibi.c3sl.ufpr.br/brapci/_repositorio/2015/12/pdf_fb223e9805_0000013443.pdf

1975 films
1970s Spanish-language films
1975 drama films
Films directed by Raúl Ruiz
Chilean drama films